Brian Fletcher (1947–2017) was an English jockey.

Brian Fletcher may also refer to:

Brian Fletcher, drummer in Magnapop
Corporal Brian Fletcher, character in North of 60
Brian Fletcher (baseball), American baseball player
Brian Fletcher (attorney), Principal Deputy Solicitor General of the United States

See also
Bryan Fletcher (disambiguation)